The Assassination of Caesar is an oil on canvas painting by German artist Heinrich Füger, created in 1818, which depicts the assassination of Julius Caesar. It is held at the Vienna Museum.

Description
The central figure of the work is Julius Caesar who is about to be stabbed by his friend Brutus, in the historical event that took place during the Ides of March, on 44 BC.

Reception
Mitchell Benjamin Frank stated that with "The Assassination of Caesar Füger works in a baroque style that blurs contour and uses a rich blending of colour" which contrasts with his contemporary Franz Pforr.

References

Paintings of the death of Julius Caesar
1818 paintings
German paintings